Eilema niveata is a moth of the  subfamily Arctiinae. It is found in New Guinea.

References

 Natural History Museum Lepidoptera generic names catalog

niveata